Evelina Eriksson (born 20 August 1996) is a Swedish handballer for CSM București and the Swedish national team.

Eriksson was chosen to participate for Sweden at the 2020 European Women's Handball Championship, but was cut from the squad right before the tournament started.

Achievements
Champions League:
Winner: 2020/2021, 2021/2022
Norwegian League:
Winner: 2020/2021, 2021/2022
Norwegian Cup:
Winner: 2020, 2021

References

1996 births
Living people
Swedish female handball players
Swedish expatriate sportspeople in Norway
Swedish expatriate sportspeople in Romania
Expatriate handball players